Rhododendron farrerae, commonly known as Mrs. Farrer's rhododendron, is a deciduous rhododendron species native to China (Hong Kong, Hunan to Fujian), with violet flowers and reaching a height of 60 cm (2 ft.). It is the type species for subsection Brachycalyx. It is found in dense mountain forests at elevations of 800–2100 m.

References

Bibliography 
 The Plant List: Rhododendron farrerae
 Hirsutum.com

External links
 
 

farrerae
Flora of China